The Star Boarder may refer to:

The Star Boarder (1914 film), an American film directed by George Nichols and starring Charlie Chaplin
The Star Boarder (1919 film), an American film directed by, and starring, Larry Semon
The Star Boarder (1920 film), an American comedy short film directed by James D. Davis